Archdioceses of Trivandrum may refer to:

Roman Catholic Archdiocese of Trivandrum, of the Latin Catholic Church
Syro-Malankara Major Archdiocese of Trivandrum, of the Syro-Malankara Catholic Church

Catholicism in India